Spring Thing is an annual competition to highlight works of text adventure games and other literary works, also known as Interactive Fiction.

Adam Cadre, author of several works of Interactive Fiction, including Photopia and Varicella, announced the Spring Thing in 2001, both to promote works that would be longer than those entered into the Interactive Fiction Competition, and to encourage authors to submit works to the general public during other times of the year. It was run in 2002 and 2003, but Cadre did not host it the following year. Greg Boettcher picked up the slack, and hosted the Spring Thing from 2005 until 2013. , Aaron A. Reed runs the competition and has been doing so since 2014.

As with the better-known Interactive Fiction Competition, works submitted to the Spring Thing must be released as freeware or public domain. Unlike that competition's limit of two hours per work, judges may spend as much time as necessary with an entry in the Spring Thing.

List of winners to date 
2002: Tinseltown Blues by Chip Hayes - the sole entrant in that year
2003: Max Blaster and Doris de Lightning Against the Parrot Creatures of Venus by Dan Shiovitz and Emily Short 
2004: No competition
2005: Whom the Telling Changed by Aaron A. Reed
2006: De baron / The Baron by Victor Gijsbers
2007: Fate by Victor Gijsbers
2008: Pascal's Wager by Doug Egan
2009: A Flustered Duck by Jim Aikin
2010: No entrants
2011: The Lost Islands of Alabaz by Michael Gentry
2012: The Rocket Man from the Sea by Janos Honkonen
2013: Witch's Girl by Mostly Useless
2014: The Price of Freedom: Innocence Lost by Briar Rose
2015: Toby's Nose by Chandler Groover (Audience Choice and Alumni's Choice)
2016: Tangaroa Deep by Astrid Dalmady (Audience Choice), The Xylophoniad by Robin Johnson (Alumni's Choice)
2017: Bobby and Bonnie by Xavid and Niney by Daniel Spitz (tie for Audience Choice)
2018: Illuminismo Iniziato by Michael J. Coyne (Audience Choice and Alumni's Choice)
2019: Among the Seasons by Kieran Green and The Missing Ring by Felicity Drake
2020: 4x4 Galaxy by Agnieszka Trzaska, Hawk The Hunter by Jonathan B. Himes, and JELLY by Tom Lento and Chandler Groover
2021: The Weight of a Soul by Chin Kee Yong and Fish & Dagger by Grave Snail Games
2022: The Bones of Rosalinda by Agnieszka Trzaska and Fairest by Amanda Walker

See also
XYZZY Awards
Interactive Fiction Competition

External links
Spring Thing Home Page

Interactive fiction
Video game development competitions